Richard Mansergh Thorne (July 25, 1942 – July 12, 2019) was an American physicist and a distinguished professor in the department of atmospheric and oceanic sciences at UCLA. He was known for his contributions to space plasma physics. He was a fellow of the American Geophysical Union.

Thorne graduated from Birmingham University in 1963 with a BS in mathematical physics. In 1968 he received a PhD in physics from MIT. The astronomer Alar Toomre was his advisor; his thesis was titled On the distribution of interstellar gas in the galaxy.

In 1968 Thorne joined the department of meteorology at UCLA (now the department of atmospheric and oceanic sciences). In 2000 he was appointed distinguished professor and elected a fellow of the American Geophysical Union. He retired in 2015.

Selected publications

References

External links
 Faculty webpage

MIT Department of Physics alumni
Fellows of the American Geophysical Union
21st-century American physicists
2019 deaths
Alumni of the University of Birmingham
1942 births
20th-century American physicists
University of California, Los Angeles faculty